Floyd Euliss Wicker (born September 12, 1943) is an American former professional baseball outfielder.

Career
He signed with the St. Louis Cardinals at age 17 and his professional career lasted from 1961–1971, with two seasons missed due to military service. He was traded from the Brewers to the Giants for Bob Heise on June 1, 1971.

His lifetime major league batting average was .159, with 18 hits in 113 at bats. In his longest MLB tenure, the Expos' maiden 1969 campaign, Wicker appeared in 41 games, almost exclusively as a pinch hitter, getting four hits in 39 at bats, for a batting average of .103.  His only MLB home run occurred as during his tenure with the Brewers: on September 26, 1970, he hit a two-run shot off Chicago White Sox starting pitcher Floyd Weaver, helping Milwaukee defeat Chicago, 9–5.

References

External links

1943 births
Living people
American expatriate baseball players in Canada
Arkansas Travelers players
Baseball players from North Carolina
Billings Mustangs players
Johnson City Cardinals players
East Carolina University alumni
Major League Baseball outfielders
Milwaukee Brewers players
Montreal Expos players
People from Burlington, North Carolina
Phoenix Giants players
Portland Beavers players
St. Louis Cardinals players
San Francisco Giants players
Tulsa Oilers (baseball) players
Winnipeg Goldeyes players